Juan Carlos Moreno Pérez (born September 28, 1975 in Nueva Gerona) is a shortstop with Isla de la Juventud and the Cuba national baseball team.
Cuban baseball league system

Career
Moreno is a mainstay on the national team, and made his international debut at the 1998 World Championships. Moreno played for the Cuban national team in the 1999 Baltimore Orioles–Cuba national baseball team exhibition series. He was also on the roster for the 2006 World Baseball Classic
]

References

1975 births
Living people
Cuban baseball players
People from Nueva Gerona
2006 World Baseball Classic players

Central American and Caribbean Games gold medalists for Cuba
Competitors at the 1998 Central American and Caribbean Games
Central American and Caribbean Games medalists in baseball